Luis Terrazas is an American politician and businessman serving as a member of the New Mexico House of Representatives from the 39th district. He assumed office on January 19, 2021.

Background 
Terrazas is a native of Grant County, New Mexico. He has founded several businesses in Deming and Las Cruces, New Mexico, including Silver City Auto Spa, Terrazas Granite and Marble, Terrazas Funeral Chapels, and Terrazas Crematory. He was elected to the New Mexico House of Representatives in 2020, defeating Democratic incumbent Rodolpho Martinez. He assumed office on January 19, 2021.

References 

Living people
People from Grant County, New Mexico
Republican Party members of the New Mexico House of Representatives
Businesspeople from New Mexico
21st-century American politicians
Year of birth missing (living people)